Héctor Eduardo Acevedo García (born March 16, 1992, in Durango City, Durango) is a Mexican professional footballer who currently plays for Alacranes de Durango. He played with Acaxees de Durango of the Liga de Balompié Mexicano during the league's inaugural season in 2020–21.

References

1992 births
Living people
Mexican footballers
Association football forwards
Cruz Azul footballers
Cruz Azul Hidalgo footballers
Alacranes de Durango footballers
Ascenso MX players
Liga Premier de México players
Tercera División de México players
Liga de Balompié Mexicano players
Footballers from Durango
People from Durango City